If I Were Rich may refer to:
 If I Were Rich (1936 film), a British comedy film
 If I Were Rich (2019 film), a Spanish comedy film